Jopp is a surname. Notable people with the surname include:

 James Jopp, provost of Aberdeen
 Patrick Jopp (born 1962), Swiss archer
 Victor Jopp (1887–1965), Canadian ice hockey player

See also
 JOP (disambiguation)
 Jopp Group
 Jupp (surname)